Peck House may refer to:

in the United States
(by state then city)
Peck House (Empire, Colorado), listed on the National Register of Historic Places (NRHP) in Clear Creek County
Bill Peck House, Challis, Idaho, listed on the NRHP in Custer County
D. H. Peck House, Twin Falls, Idaho, listed on the NRHP in Twin Falls County
Peck House, Geneva, Illinois
Bradford Peck House, Lewiston, Maine, listed on the NRHP in Androscoggin County
John M. Peck House, Waltham, Massachusetts, listed on the NRHP in Middlesex County
Peck-Bowen House, Rehoboth, Massachusetts, listed on the NRHP in Bristol County
Peck-Porter House, Walpole, New Hampshire, listed on the NRHP in Cheshire County
Peck House (Chatham, New York), listed on the NRHP in Columbia County
Henry M. Peck House, Haverstraw, New York, listed on the NRHP in Rockland County
J. Franklin Peck House, Lima, New York, listed on the NRHP in Livingston County
Thomas Peck Farmhouse, Lima, New York, listed on the NRHP in Livingston County
Judge William V. Peck House, Portsmouth, Ohio, listed on the NRHP in Scioto County
L. W. Peck House, Eagleville, Ohio, listed on the NRHP in Ashtabula County
Capt. Barton Peck House, Goliad, Texas, listed on the NRHP in Goliad County
Peck-Crim-Chesser House, Philippi, West Virginia, listed on the NRHP in Barbour County
Walter L. Peck House, Oconomowoc, Wisconsin, listed on the NRHP in Waukesha County
Clarence Peck Residence, Oconomowoc, Wisconsin, listed on the NRHP in Waukesha County